Rivers of Serbia and Montenegro may refer to:
Rivers of Serbia
Rivers of Montenegro